Banī Wahbān is a sub-district located in the Shar'ab as-Salam District, Taiz Governorate, Yemen. Banī Wahbān had a population of 7,133 according to the 2004 census. It lies in close proximity to the border with Ibb Governorate and contains the Mosque of Muhammad ibn Ziyad and a school.

Villages
al-Shal village.
al-Sanab village.
Khasha' village.
Wadi Hizam village.
al-Suhilah village.
Hijajuh village.
al-Wariduh village.
Qayd village.
al-Badirah village.
Al-Mihdadah village.
Qardan village.
al-Saa'id village.

References

Sub-districts in Shar'ab as-Salam District